Didicrum is a genus of the family Psychodidae and has a handful of species studied so far. The discovery of this genus in Colombia represents a significant range extension for Didicrum as all previously described species of this genus are distributed in the Australasian region and the southernmost portion of South America.

Species
Didicrum agreste (Quate & Quate, 1967)
Didicrum clarkei (Satchell, 1954)
Didicrum claviatum (Satchell, 1950)
Didicrum colombensis Moya-Arévalo, Ibnáñez-Bernal & Suárez-Landa, 2012
Didicrum contigua (Tonnoir, 1929)
Didicrum deceptrix Quate & Brown, 2004
Didicrum drepanatum (Satchell, 1950)
Didicrum fenestrata (Tonnoir, 1929)
Didicrum griseatum (Tonnoir, 1929)
Didicrum inornata (Tonnoir, 1929)
Didicrum letitiae Omad, 2014
Didicrum maurum (Satchell, 1950)
Didicrum naimae Omad, 2014
Didicrum peregrinum (Quate & Quate, 1967)
Didicrum punctulatum (Tonnoir, 1953)
Didicrum pyramidon Quate & Brown, 2004
Didicrum remulum Quate & Brown, 2004
Didicrum simplex (Tonnoir, 1929)
Didicrum solitarium (Satchell, 1954)
Didicrum steffani (Quate & Quate, 1967)
Didicrum triuncinatum (Satchell, 1950)
Didicrum uniformatum (Tonnoir, 1953)
Didicrum viduata (Tonnoir, 1929)

References

Nematocera genera
Diptera of Australasia
Diptera of South America
Taxa named by Günther Enderlein
Psychodidae